The 2019–20 Football Championship of Ivano-Frankivsk Oblast was won by Pokuttia Kolomyia.

First League table

References

Football
Ivano-Frankivsk